Fellows of the Royal Society elected in 1985.

Fellows

Michael Barber  (1934–1991)
Peter Humphry Greenwood  (1927–1995)
Martyn Christian Raymond Symons  (1925–2002)
Walter Laing Macdonald Perry Baron Perry of Walton (1921–2003)
Roger Michael Needham  (1935–2003)
Dame Miriam Louisa Rothschild  (1908–2005)
Sir Nicholas John Shackleton  (1937–2006)
Naomi Datta  (d. 2008)
Duncan Joseph Greenwood  (d. 2010)
Anne Elizabeth Warner  (d. 2012)
George Edward Pelham Box  (1919–2013)
Struther Arnott  (d. 2013)
Wyndham John Albery
Mark Steven Bretscher
Ronald Bullough
Malcolm Burrows
John Henry Coates
David Colquhoun
John Leonard Celistus Culhane
John Frederick Dewey
Sir Diarmuid Downs
Jonathan Richard Ellis
Sir John Edwin Enderby
Michael Gaster
Malcolm Leslie Hodder Green
Cedric Herbert Hassall
William George Hill
Nevin Campbell Hughes-Jones
Ian Macpherson Kerr
Philip Douglas Magnus
David Quinn Mayne
John Edwin Midwinter
James Dickson Murray
John Stewart Pate
Ian Colin Percival
Martin Charles Raff
Joseph Frank Sambrook
John Michael Tutill Thompson
Donald Walker
Gerald Westheimer

Foreign members

 Konrad Emil Bloch (1912–2000)
 Shiing-Shen Chern (1911–2004)
Charles Yanofsky
 Frank Press
Knut Schmidt-Nielsen  (1915–2007)
 Glenn Theodore Seaborg (1912–1999)

References

1985
1985 in science
1985 in the United Kingdom